Dmitri Alekseyevich Agaptsev (born 29 November 1991) is a Russian football forward. He plays for SShOR Balashikha.

Club career
He made his debut in the Russian Second Division for FC Zenit Penza on 5 August 2011 in a game against FC Sokol Saratov.

He made his Russian Football National League debut for FC Sokol Saratov on 6 July 2014 in a game against FC Yenisey Krasnoyarsk.

References

External links
 

1991 births
Living people
Russian footballers
FC Sokol Saratov players
Association football forwards
FC Moscow players
FC Torpedo Vladimir players